The Ambassador of the Republic of the Philippines to the United Kingdom, known formally in the United Kingdom as the Ambassador of the Republic of the Philippines to the Court of St James's, is the Republic of the Philippines' foremost diplomatic representative in the United Kingdom. As head of the Philippines' diplomatic mission there, the Ambassador is the official representative of the President and the Government of the Philippines to the King and Government of the United Kingdom of Great Britain and Northern Ireland. The position has the rank and status of an Ambassador Extraordinary and Plenipotentiary and is based at the embassy at 6-11 Suffolk Street, London, United Kingdom. The Philippine ambassador to the United Kingdom is also accredited as non-resident ambassador to the Republic of Ireland.

The position is currently held by former Secretary of Foreign Affairs Teodoro Locsin Jr. since August 30, 2022.

History
The diplomatic relations between the Philippines and the United Kingdom was established on July 4, 1946, after the British government recognized the independence of the Philippines from its 48-year colonial rule by the United States. The two countries were previously fought on the same side under the Allied Powers during the Second World War.

List of ambassadors to the United Kingdom (1946–present)

See also
Philippines–United Kingdom relations
List of ambassadors of the United Kingdom to the Philippines
Foreign relations of the Philippines
Foreign relations of the United Kingdom

References

External links
Philippine Embassy in London
Previous ambassadors of the Philippines to the United Kingdom

 
Philippines
United Kingdom